Adrian Ballinger (born February 25, 1976) is a British-American certified IFMGA/AMGA mountain guide, certified through the American Mountain Guides Association (AMGA Rock, Alpine, and Ski Certifications) and a sponsored climber and skier. Ballinger is the founder and CEO of Alpenglow Expeditions, and has been guiding full-time for 25 years. He has led over 150 international climbing expeditions on six continents, and made 18 successful summits of 8,000m peaks. He is known for pioneering the use of pre-acclimatization for commercial expeditions as early as 2012, which can cut the amount of time typically spent on an expedition in half. Adrian is the only American to have made three successful ski descents of 8,000m peaks, including the first ski descent of Manaslu from its summit. He is also the fourth American to have summited both Mount Everest and K2 without the use of supplemental oxygen.

About 
Ballinger worked as a guide for Himalayan Experience until 2012, and was featured with Himex founder, Russell Brice, on the Discovery Channel's Everest: Beyond the Limit series. In 2004, Adrian founded Alpenglow Expeditions, a mountain guiding company based out of Squaw Valley, CA, U.S.A, where he has served as the CEO and lead guide.

Since 2008, he has achieved 18 successful 8,000m summits, reaching the summit of Everest 8 times, Manaslu 4 times, Cho Oyu 3 times, and both K2 and Lhotse once. He has also led three expeditions to Makalu, the world's fifth tallest peak. In 2011 he became the first person to summit three 8,000m peaks in just three weeks, reaching the summit of Everest twice and Lhotse once.

Ballinger has led successful expeditions to more than 40 Himalayan summits over 6000 meters, including twelve ascents of Ama Dablam, a highly technical 6,812m peak next to Everest. In 2010, he led an Alpenglow Expeditions Clean Up Expedition on Ama Dablam. This team, along with climbing the mountain, removed thousands of feet of old fixed rope from the route and hundreds of pounds of trash from the camps. They also provided outreach to Sherpa and members of other climbing teams to teach the use of human waste disposal kits while on the mountain, and donated human waste disposal bags to many of those teams.

Ballinger has also guided on Kilimanjaro (14 times by 4 different routes), Denali (by the West Rib), Alpamayo (14 times by 3 different routes), Huascarán Sur (3 times by 2 routes), Cotopaxi (more than 30 times), and many other expeditions including multiple ascents on Orizaba, Wayna Potosí, Kitarahu, Chopicalqui, Chimborazo, Cayambe, Mont Blanc, Elbrus, Island Peak, Lobuche Peak, Mera Peak and many North American peaks.

Adrian's personal ascents include technical alpine-style climbs on the South Ridge of Pumori, the West Face of Kayish, and the NE Ridge of Huascaran Norte.

Ballinger is also ski, ice, and rock guides for the guide company he founded, Alpenglow Expeditions, in Lake Tahoe, California.

Adrian has been featured in numerous climbing and skiing industry articles and press.

Alpenglow Expeditions 
Adrian founded Alpenglow Expeditions in 2004, and since then has grown it to be one of the premier mountain guide companies in the United States. Based in Olympic Valley, CA. Alpenglow Expeditions leads over 30 international expeditions on 6 continents yearly. They also run a local climbing, backcountry skiing, and backcountry education program out of Olympic Valley, taking over 4,000 clients out per year.

Personal life 
Adrian is married to professional climber and The North Face Athlete Emily Harrington.

8,000m Expedition Career 
In 2008, Adrian summited his first 8,000m peak, making the summit of Manaslu on Oct.3rd

In 2009, Adrian summited Mount Everest for the first time via the Southwest Face on May 21. In the fall he summited Manaslu for the second time on Oct. 1st.

In 2010, Ballanger summited Mount Everest twice in the three weeks, first on May 5 and then again on May 22. On his May 5 summit, Ballinger was the first non-Sherpa of the season to summit as he fixed ropes, replaced anchors, and removed old ropes from the mountain in partnership with 9 Sherpa.

In October 2010, Adrian made his third ascent of Manaslu on Oct 1st.

In 2011, Adrian again summited Everest twice in three weeks, making the summit on May 5 and May 20. A few days later on May 26, he summited Lhotse.

In the Fall of 2011, Ballinger completed the first ski descent of Manaslu, descending from its summit on Oct. 5th.

In 2013, he successfully reached the summit of Cho Oyu, making a ski descent from the summit on Sept. 25th

In 2016, Adrian Ballinger and Cory Richards were sponsored by Eddie Bauer to attempt a climb Mount Everest without the use of supplemental oxygen. They relayed information from the Everest climb using the smartphone software application and service called Snapchat in a series title “Everest No Filter”. Adrian’s summit attempt was unsuccessful.

In the fall of 2016, Ballinger made a second ski descent of Cho Oyu with his partner Emily Harrington, completing the complete expedition in a record setting 14 days door-to-door from the USA.

In 2017, Adrian and Cory Richards returned to Everest for a second attempt at climbing the peak without oxygen. On May 27, Adrian reached the summit of Mount Everest without the use of supplemental oxygen.

In 2018, Ballinger made his third ascent of Cho Oyu on May 6, and his eighth summit of Everest on May 20.

In 2019, Adrian served as the lead guide and expedition outfitter for a Discovery Channel sponsored expedition attempting to uncover the mystery of whether George Mallory and Andrew Irvine made the first summit of Mount Everest in 1924. The expedition was filmed and released as a Discovery.com documentary released in October 2020 called Everest's Greatest Mystery.

Also in 2019, an expedition sponsored by Eddie Bauer, Adrian Ballinger and fellow Alpenglow Expeditions guide Carla Perez made an attempt to climb K2 without the use of supplemental oxygen. On July 24, they reached the summit of the second tallest peak on the planet without the use of bottled oxygen. They were supported by Esteban “Topo” Mena, Palden Namgye Sherpa, and Pemba Geija Sherpa. The climb was made into a film produced by Eddie Bauer titled Breathtaking: K2 - The World's Most Dangerous Mountain.

In 2022, Adrian returned to Makalu and made the first ski descent. Skiing from the Summit to crampon point before descending back to ABC the same day. Adrian started his ski descent from 15m below the summit due to crowding on the summit. He rappelled a 60m section in the French Couloir without his skis, and descended the rest of the mountain rappelling and using the fixed lines as hand lines sparingly.

8,000m Summits

Everest, (8,848m, 29,032’):
May 21, 2009
May 5, 2010
May 22, 2010
May 5, 2011
May 20, 2011
May 18, 2013
May 27, 2017 (without supplemental oxygen)
May 20, 2018

K2, (8,611m, 28,251’):
July 24, 2019 (without supplemental oxygen)

Lhotse, (8,516m, 27,940’):
May 26, 2011
Makalu, (8,481m, 27,824'):

 May 8, 2022

Cho Oyu, (8,188m, 26,906’):

 Sept 25, 2013 (Ski Descent)
 Oct 1st, 2016 (Ski Descent)
 May 6, 2018

Manaslu, (8,163m, 26,759’):

 Oct 3rd, 2008
 Sept 28, 2009
 Oct 1st, 2010
 Oct 5th, 2011 (Ski Descent)

See also
List of Mount Everest summiters by number of times to the summit
List of Mount Everest guides

References

Living people
American mountain climbers
American summiters of Mount Everest
1976 births